Anthony Oxley (1942-2015), was a male international boxer who competed for England, a national boxing coach and international security officer. He fought as Tony Oxley.

Boxing career
Oxley was effectively the National champion in 1971 after winning the 1971 bantamweight ABA championships.

He represented England in the 54 kg bantamweight division, at the 1970 British Commonwealth Games in Edinburgh, Scotland.

He also won the Royal Navy and Combined Services championships.

Coaching career
In 1974 he was appointed the Royal Navy coach and an England coach the following year. Between 1978 and 1982 his team won five back-to-back Combined Services championships and five ABA titles.

Military career
Oxley joined the Royal Navy in 1961 and left in 1983, he then joined HM Diplomatic Service as a security officer.

References

1942 births
2015 deaths
English male boxers
Boxers at the 1970 British Commonwealth Games
Bantamweight boxers
Commonwealth Games competitors for England